Sudzhansky Uyezd (Суджа́нский уе́зд) was one of the subdivisions of the Kursk Governorate of the Russian Empire. It was situated in the western part of the governorate. Its administrative centre was Sudzha.

Demographics
At the time of the Russian Empire Census of 1897, Sudzhansky Uyezd had a population of 150,263. Of these, 51.9% spoke Russian, 47.9% Ukrainian, 0.1% Yiddish and 0.1% Polish as their native language.

References

 
Uezds of Kursk Governorate
Kursk Governorate